Tellurium trioxide (TeO3) is an inorganic chemical compound of tellurium and oxygen. In this compound, tellurium is in the +6 oxidation state.

Polymorphs
There are two forms, yellow-red α-TeO3 and grey, rhombohedral, β-TeO3 which is less reactive.
α-TeO3 has a structure similar to FeF3 with octahedral TeO6 units that share all vertices.

Preparation
α-TeO3 can be prepared by heating orthotelluric acid, Te(OH)6, at over 300 °C.  The β-TeO3  form can be prepared by heating α-TeO3  in a sealed tube with O2 and H2SO4.
α-TeO3 is unreactive to water but is a powerful oxidising agent when heated. With alkalis it forms tellurates.
α-TeO3 when heated loses oxygen to form firstly Te2O5  and then TeO2.

References

Oxides
Tellurium(VI) compounds
Interchalcogens